Next Thing is the second studio album by Frankie Cosmos, the stage name of American singer-songwriter Greta Kline, released on April 1, 2016 on Bayonet Records.

Critical reception

At Metacritic, which assigns a normalized rating out of 100 to reviews from mainstream critics, the album received an average score of 78, based on 17 reviews, which indicates "generally favorable reviews".

Kevin Lozano of Pitchfork praised the album stating, "Her greatest talent remains her ability to transform minute-long songs into experiences that resemble hours of intimate and impressionistic conversation." Lozano continues, "Many of the songs ("Embody," "On the Lips," "Too Dark" and "Sleep Song") on the album have appeared in acoustic permutations in past work, and they make the leap seamlessly. Each are marvelously well-wrought trains of thought, cramming existential questions into the banality of everyday moments and finding something beatific even in the plainest of things."

Accolades

Track listing

Personnel
 Greta Kline – performing, lead vocals
 Aaron Maine – performing
 David Maine – performing
 Gabrielle Smith – performing
 Hunter Davidsohn – performing
 Meredith Wilson – artwork

Charts

References

External links
 

2016 albums
Frankie Cosmos albums
Bayonet Records albums